State Route 28 (SR 28) is a state highway in the U.S. state of California that travels along the northern shore of Lake Tahoe, starting at Route 89 in Tahoe City and ending at the Nevada state border, whereupon it becomes Nevada State Route 28.

Route description

The route begins at SR 89 in Tahoe City and heads eastward. It then intersects SR 267 in Kings Beach and continues to its terminus at Nevada State Route 28 at the Nevada state line.  Route 28 is one of only three state routes that keep the same number in Nevada, along with Route 88 and Route 266.

SR 28 is part of the California Freeway and Expressway System, but is not part of the National Highway System, a network of highways that are considered essential to the country's economy, defense, and mobility by the Federal Highway Administration. SR 28 is eligible for the State Scenic Highway System, but it is not officially designated as a scenic highway by the California Department of Transportation.

Major intersections

See also

 List of state highways in California

References

External links

 Caltrans: Route 28 highway conditions
 California Highways: SR 28
 California @ AARoads.com - State Route 28

028
State Route 028
Lake Tahoe